Márton Czuczi (born 20 May 1992 in Budapest) is a Hungarian football player who currently plays for FC Dabas.

Career
In 2019, Czuczi returned to Pénzügyőr SE.

Club statistics

Updated to games played as of 27 April 2014.

References

External links
 
 

1992 births
Living people
Footballers from Budapest
Hungarian footballers
Association football goalkeepers
Budapest Honvéd FC players
Békéscsaba 1912 Előre footballers
Szigetszentmiklósi TK footballers
Mezőkövesdi SE footballers
Pénzügyőr SE footballers
Monori SE players
FC Dabas footballers
Nemzeti Bajnokság I players
Nemzeti Bajnokság II players
21st-century Hungarian people